The Chancellor of the University of Paris was originally the chancellor of the chapter of Notre Dame de Paris. The medieval University of Paris ceased to exist in 1793 (though it was revived as the University of France between 1806 and 1970), but a related position, Chancellor of the Universities of Paris, is currently held by Maurice Quénet.

List of chancellors

12th century
Petrus Comestor
Peter of Poitiers

13th century
Praepositinus (1206-1209)
Robert of Courçon (1211-)
Philip the Chancellor (1217-1236)
Walter of Château-Thierry (1246-1249)
Erich von Veire
Étienne Tempier (1263-1268)

14th century
Robert de Bardis (1336-)
Grimerius Bonifacci
John of Calore
John Blanchard
Pierre d'Ailly (1389-1395)
Jean Gerson (1395-)

Later chancellors
Jean de Gagny (1546-)
Georges Cuvier

See also
List of rectors of the University of Paris
List of University of Paris people
Société des Amis des Universités de Paris

 
Lists of people by university or college in France